Crimson Glory is the debut studio album by the American heavy metal band Crimson Glory, originally released in 1986 on Par Records in the US. It was later licensed by and re-issued on Roadrunner Records in Europe.

In 2006, Greek record label Black Lotus Records announced plans to release a re-mastered and expanded version with a new title, "Lost Reflections" and two previously unreleased songs, "Love Me, Kill Me" and "Dream Dancer". However, citing bankruptcy, Black Lotus ceased operations before this release came to fruition.

Track listing

Personnel 
 Midnight – lead vocals
 Jon Drenning – lead guitar, synclavier
 Ben Jackson – rhythm guitar
 Jeff Lords – bass guitar
 Dana Burnell – drums
Additional musicians
 Peter Abood – emulator, synclavier
 Jim Morris – emulator programming
 Lex Macar – synclavier programming

Production
 Dan Johnson – producer
 Jim Morris – engineer
 Mike Fuller – mastering at Fullersound, Miami

References

External links
 

Crimson Glory albums
1986 debut albums
Roadrunner Records albums
Albums recorded at Morrisound Recording